Bhikhabhai Ravjibhai Baraiya is an Indian politician and member of the Gujarat Legislative Assembly from Palitana constituency belonging to the Bhartiya Janata Party. He was formerly a member of Indian National Congress party.

The Mr. Baraiya belong to the Koli caste of Gujarat.

References 

Living people
1967 births
Indian politicians
People from Gujarat
Indian National Congress politicians from Gujarat